The 1919–20 season is the 46th season of competitive football by Rangers.

Overview
Rangers played a total of 50 competitive matches during the 1919–20 season. This was the first full season since the end of the First World War and clubs who were asked to retire for geographical reasons during the war returned along with the Scottish Cup, which had been withdrawn.

The team won the league championship with thirty-one wins from there forty-two matches, however the Scottish Cup campaign was ended at the hands of Albion Rovers. It took a second replay to separate the sides and a 2–0 win for Rovers saw them go through to the 1920 Scottish Cup Final.

Results
All results are written with Rangers' score first.

Scottish League Division One

Scottish Cup

Appearances

See also
 1919–20 in Scottish football
 1919–20 Scottish Cup

Rangers F.C. seasons
Rangers
Scottish football championship-winning seasons